Ramayana Ballet Prambanan is a visualization of Kakawin Ramayana, Javanese version of Ramayana story, performed near the Prambanan temple, Indonesia. The Ramayana Ballet at the Prambanan isn't like the Western ballet performance, It's more like the Wayang wong.

Episodic story
The entire Ramayana story consist of four episodes and full story, each night one episode, in four clear night and full moon each month May through October, of which (1) First, the Abduction of Dewi Sita, (2) Second, Hanuman on fire, (3) Third, death of Kumbakarna, and (4) the last, Rama meet Sita.

See also
Ballet music
History of ballet

References

Dance in Indonesia
Works based on the Ramayana